The Algonquian are one of the most populous and widespread North American native language groups. Historically, the peoples were prominent along the Atlantic Coast and into the interior along the Saint Lawrence River and around the Great Lakes. This grouping consists of the peoples who speak Algonquian languages.

Before Europeans came into contact, most Algonquian settlements lived by hunting and fishing, although many of them supplemented their diet by cultivating corn, beans and squash (the "Three Sisters"). The Ojibwe cultivated wild rice.

Colonial period

At the time of the first European settlements in North America, Algonquian peoples occupied what is now New Brunswick, and much of what is now Canada east of the Rocky Mountains; what is now New England, New Jersey, southeastern New York, Delaware and down the Atlantic Coast through the Upper South; and around the Great Lakes in present-day Minnesota, Wisconsin, Michigan, Illinois, Indiana and Iowa. The homeland of the Algonquian peoples is not known. At the time of the European arrival, the hegemonic Iroquois Confederacy, based in present-day New York and Pennsylvania, was regularly at war with Algonquian neighbours.

Tribal identity
The Algonquian peoples include and have included historical populations in:

 Mohegan of Connecticut, United States
 Chowanoke, formerly of North Carolina
 Carolina Algonquian
 Roanoke, formerly of North Carolina
 Croatan, formerly of North Carolina
 Powhatan Confederacy of Virginia
 Pamunkey of Virginia, United States
 Powhatan people of Virginia, United States
 Wampanoag of Massachusetts
 Wabanaki of the Maritime provinces/Atlantic provinces in Canada and New England in the United States
 Abenaki of Quebec, Canada; historically New Hampshire, Maine and Vermont.
 Penobscot of Maine
 Miꞌkmaq of Maine, New Brunswick, Nova Scotia, Quebec and Newfoundland
 Passamaquoddy of Maine, United States, and New Brunswick, Canada.
 Maliseet of New Brunswick and Quebec
 Shawnee, formerly of the Ohio River Valley, now Oklahoma
 Central Algonquian peoples
 Kickapoo (Kikapú, Kiikaapoa, Kiikaapoi): originally from southeast Michigan and Wisconsin United States; now in Kansas, Oklahoma, and Texas, United States; Coahuila, Mexico
 Peoria (Illiniwek), formerly Illinois now Oklahoma
 Anishinaabe, Great Lakes, Subarctic, Northern Plains
 Ojibwe (including the Saulteaux and Oji-Cree)), Minnesota, North Dakota, and Michigan, United States, as well as Ontario, Canada
 Potawatomi of Michigan, Indiana, Kansas, Oklahoma, United States; Ontario, Canada
 Odawa of Michigan and now Oklahoma, United States; Ontario, Canada
 Mississaugas of Ontario, Canada
 Nipissing of Ontario, Canada.
 Algonquin of Ontario and Quebec, Canada 
 Cree of Alberta, Manitoba, Ontario, Saskatchewan, and the Northwest Territories, Canada, as well as Montana, United States.

New England area
Colonists in the Massachusetts Bay area first encountered the Wampanoag, Massachusett, Nipmuc, Pennacook, Penobscot, Passamaquoddy, and Quinnipiac. The Mohegan, Pequot, Pocumtuc, Podunk, Tunxis, and Narragansett were based in southern New England. The Abenaki were located in northern New England: present-day Maine, New Hampshire, and Vermont in what became the United States and eastern Quebec in what became Canada. They traded with French colonists who settled along the Atlantic coast and the Saint Lawrence River. The Mahican were located in western New England in the upper Hudson River Valley (around present-day Albany, New York). These groups cultivated crops, hunted, and fished.

The Algonquians of New England such as the Piscataway (who spoke Eastern Algonquian), practised a seasonal economy. The basic social unit was the village: a few hundred people related by a clan kinship structure. Villages were temporary and mobile. The people moved to locations of greatest natural food supply, often breaking into smaller units or gathering as the circumstances required. This custom resulted in a certain degree of intertribal mobility, especially in troubled times.

In warm weather, they constructed portable wigwams, a type of hut usually with buckskin doors. In the winter, they erected the more substantial longhouses, in which more than one clan could reside. They cached food supplies in more permanent, semi-subterranean structures.

In the spring, when the fish were spawning, they left the winter camps to build villages at coastal locations and waterfalls. In March, they caught smelt in nets and weirs, moving about in birch bark canoes. In April, they netted alewife, sturgeon and salmon. In May, they caught cod with hook and line in the ocean; and trout, smelt, striped bass and flounder in the estuaries and streams. Putting out to sea, they hunted whales, porpoises, walruses and seals. They gathered scallops, mussels, clams and crabs and, in southern New Jersey, harvested clams year-round.

From April through October, natives hunted migratory birds and their eggs: Canada geese, brant, mourning doves and others. In July and August they gathered strawberries, raspberries, blueberries and nuts. In September, they split into small groups and moved up the streams to the forest. There, they hunted beaver, caribou, moose and white-tailed deer.

In December, when the snows began, the people created larger winter camps in sheltered locations, where they built or reconstructed longhouses. February and March were lean times. The tribes in southern New England and other northern latitudes had to rely on cached food. Northerners developed a practice of going hungry for several days at a time. Historians hypothesize that this practice kept the population down, according to Liebig's law of the minimum. 

The southern Algonquians of New England relied predominantly on slash and burn agriculture. They cleared fields by burning for one or two years of cultivation, after which the village moved to another location. This is the reason the English found the region relatively cleared and ready for planting. By using various kinds of native corn (maize), beans and squash, southern New England natives were able to improve their diet to such a degree that their population increased and they reached a density of 287 people per 100 square miles as opposed to 41 in the north.

Scholars estimate that, by the year 1600, the indigenous population of New England had reached 70,000–100,000.

Midwest
The French encountered Algonquian peoples in this area through their trade and limited colonization of New France along the Mississippi and Ohio rivers. The historic peoples of the Illinois Country were the Shawnee, Illiniwek, Kickapoo, Menominee, Miami, Sauk and Meskwaki. The latter were also known as the Sac and Fox, and later known as the Meskwaki Indians, who lived throughout the present-day Midwest of the United States.

During the nineteenth century, many Native Americans from east of the Mississippi River were displaced over great distances through the United States passage and enforcement of Indian removal legislation; they forced the people west of the Mississippi River to what they designated as Indian Territory. After the US extinguished Indian land claims, this area was admitted as the state of Oklahoma in the early 20th century.

Upper west
Ojibwe/Chippewa, Odawa, Potawatomi, and a variety of Cree groups lived in Upper Peninsula of Michigan, Western Ontario, Wisconsin, Minnesota, and the Canadian Prairies. The Arapaho, Blackfoot and Cheyenne developed as indigenous to the Great Plains.

List of historic Algonquian-speaking peoples

 Algonquin
 Abenaki
 Missiquoi
 Pennacook
 Arapaho
 Beothuk
 Blackfoot
 Cheyenne
 Chowanoke
 Cree
 Gros Ventre
 Illinois
 Kickapoo
 Lenape
 Munsee
 Wappinger
 Unami
 Meskwaki
 Menominee
 Mahican
 Maliseet
 Mascouten
 Massachusett
 Mattabesic
 Mattabessett
 Podunk
 Tunxis
 Paugussett
 Quinnipiac
 Unquachog
 Miami
 Mi'kmaq
 Montaukett
 Mohegan
 Nanticoke
 Piscataway
 Nacotchtank
 Narragansett
 Nipissing
 Nipmuc
 Odawa
 Ojibwe
 Mississauga
 Passamaquoddy
 Penobscot
 Pequot
 Potawatomi
 Powhatan
 Sauk
 Shawnee
 Chalahgawtha
 Hathawekela
 Kispoko
 Mekoche
 Pekowi
 Secotan
 Roanoke people
 Croatan
 Wampanoag
 Weapemeoc
 Plains Cree

Footnotes

Further reading
Melissa Otis, Rural Indigenousness: A History of Iroquoian and Algonquian Peoples of the Adirondacks. Syracuse, NY: Syracuse University Press, 2018.

External links

 
Indigenous peoples of the Northeastern Woodlands
Great Lakes tribes
Indigenous peoples in the United States
First Nations in Ontario
First Nations in Quebec
First Nations in Atlantic Canada
First Nations in Alberta
First Nations in Saskatchewan
First Nations in Manitoba
Native American tribes in North Carolina